Achille Bianchi (February 16, 1837 – ?) was an Italian  sculptor.

Biography
He was born in Milan to a father who was an artist, and pursued studies at the Brera Academy under Benedetto Cacciatori. He was awarded a stipend to study in Florence and Rome. He sent to the academy as essays The entry of Christ into Jerusalem from Florence, and from Rome, a larger than life statue of Carmagnola defends himself from the accusation of treason.

In 1880, he settled in Rome, and had on Via del Babbuino a studio, once owned by his friend Giovanni Lombardi. Here Bianchi specialized in portraits for the cemeteries of Rome. He also is known for the following works: Susanna; Pia de' Tolomei; Rebecca; Nidia, the blind flower seller of Pompei from the novel of Edward Bulwer-Lytton; L'Armida from the work of Tasso; Ildegonda; Desdemona, awarded a first class medal at Oporto and winning him a decoration of the Knights of Christ. He also made the monument to his mother, and the funeral monument for the  famiglia Puricelli-Guerra Family at the cemetery of Milan. He sculpted the altar of the church of Santa Maria delle Grazie, Brescia based on a design by Tagliaferri. In the cemetery of Rome are two monuments for the brothers Lombardi, both sculptors. Among his masterworks are the statues of Kinzica de' Sismondi of Pisa and of Alpinolo.

References

1837 births
Artists from Milan
19th-century Italian sculptors
Italian male sculptors
Year of death missing
19th-century Italian male artists